Don't Let the Angels Fall is a 1969 Canadian drama film directed by George Kaczender. In 1971, it was named Best Foreign Feature Film by the Critics and Journalists Association of Ceylon.

Plot
A Montreal businessman (Arthur Hill), who's going through a mid-life crisis and on a business trip out of town, has a brief affair with a divorcée (Sharon Acker). His family is falling apart and his wife (Charmion King) seems incapable of understanding what's going on.

Cast

References

Works cited

External links

National Film Board of Canada Web page

1969 films
1969 drama films
Canadian drama films
Canadian black-and-white films
English-language Canadian films
Films directed by George Kaczender
National Film Board of Canada films
Works by Timothy Findley
Films produced by John Kemeny
1960s English-language films
1960s Canadian films